Bull horn acacia is a common name for several plants in Vachellia with large thorns resembling a bull's horns:

Vachellia collinsii, native to Central America and parts of Africa
Vachellia cornigera, native to Mexico and Central America
Vachellia sphaerocephala, endemic to Mexico